Astragalus robbinsii is a species of milkvetch known by the common name Robbins's milkvetch. It is native to North America, where it is widespread with several varieties originating from different regions.

A. r. var. alpiniformis is endemic to Oregon.
A. r. var. fernaldii is known from Quebec and Newfoundland and Labrador.
A. r. var. harringtonii is endemic to Alaska.
A. r. var. jesupii is a rare variety known only from three locations on the Connecticut River in New Hampshire and Vermont and is a federally listed endangered species.
A. r. var. minor, the most widespread variety, can be found in western North America and eastern Canada.
A. r. var. occidentalis is a rare variety endemic to the Ruby Mountains of Nevada.
A. r. var. robbinsii is endemic to Vermont.

References

External links
USDA Plants Profile

robbinsii